The Philip Nice House is a single-family home located at 321 Center Street in Mason, Michigan. It was listed on the National Register of Historic Places in 1985.

History
Philip Nice was born in Lautersheim, Germany in 1832, and emigrated to the United States at the age of seventeen.  He arrived in Mason in 1861, and lived outside the city working as a farmer. He was also involved in lumbering and gravel extraction. In 1867, he purchased two lots and had this house built for his family. The Nices lived here until 1883, when the house was purchased by Elisha and Betsy Bennett, who owned a business block in downtown Mason.

Description
The Philip Nice House is a brick Upright and Wing house with a two-story upright and a single-story wing. It has gently sloping roofs with wide frieze boards. The windows are four-over-four units topped with brick voussoir segmental arches and flanked with shutters. The side wing has an entryway through an early twentieth-century porch with a pedimented roof supported by round, tapered columns.

References

		
National Register of Historic Places in Ingham County, Michigan
Houses completed in 1867